The Ben Stiller Show is an American sketch comedy series that aired on MTV from 1990 to 1991, and then 12 episodes on Fox from September 27, 1992, to January 17, 1993, with a 13th episode of the Fox version airing on 1995 on Comedy Central. The Fox program starred Ben Stiller, Andy Dick, Janeane Garofalo and Bob Odenkirk. Character actor John F. O'Donohue also appeared in every episode.

The program featured numerous filmed comedy segments, many of which parodied middle of the 1980s to beginning of the 1990s pop culture. Despite mostly positive reviews, Fox canceled the series after only 13 episodes, due to low ratings.

Unlike most sketch comedy programs, The Ben Stiller Show did not use a studio audience, and was the first ever Fox sketch comedy program not to use a laugh track. The semi spinoff, The Andy Dick Show, used the same format. After cancelation, the series won the 1993 Emmy Award for Outstanding Writing in a Variety or Music Program.

MTV series
The original MTV version of The Ben Stiller Show aired in 1990 to 1991, and ran for 13 episodes. It is not available on DVD, although excerpts from the program are featured as a bonus on the release of the Fox series. Produced by Jim Jones, who would go on to produce the Fox series and starring Ben Stiller and co writer Jeff Kahn, it was a self effacing show within a show format.

Part of MTV's pre-Real World and experimental Vid-Com season of 1989 to 1990, it was interspersed with music videos that Ben and company would introduce in their short comedy sketches. Regulars included Harry O'Reilly and Ben's sister Amy Stiller.  Guest stars included Ben's parents Anne Meara and Jerry Stiller, as well as John F. O'Donohue, Melina Kanakaredes, Al Lewis and MTV regular Martha Quinn.

Episodes

Home media
Warner Home Video released all 13 episodes of the Fox version of The Ben Stiller Show on DVD in Region 1 on December 2, 2003.

Reunion
In November 2012, there was a reunion at the New York Comedy Festival with the original cast members. Apatow hosted the reunion which featured Stiller, Janeane Garofalo, Andy Dick and staff writers Robert Cohen and Jeff Kahn. Bob Odenkirk also appeared via Skype video chat.

References

External links
 The Ben Stiller Show IFC page
 

1990s American sketch comedy television series
1992 American television series debuts
1993 American television series endings
Fox Broadcasting Company original programming
MTV original programming
Primetime Emmy Award-winning television series
English-language television shows
Television series by HBO Independent Productions
Television series created by Judd Apatow
Television shows set in Los Angeles